Sigmundur Gudmundsson (born 1960) is an Icelandic-Swedish mathematician working at Lund University in the fields of differential geometry and global analysis. He is mainly interested in the geometric aspects of harmonic maps and their derivatives, such as  harmonic morphisms and p-harmonic functions. His work is partially devoted to the existence theory of complex-valued harmonic morphisms and p-harmonic functions from Riemannian homogeneous spaces of various types, such as symmetric spaces and semisimple, solvable and nilpotent Lie groups.
 

Gudmundsson earned his Ph.D. from the University of Leeds in 1992, under the supervision of John C. Wood.

Gudmundsson is the founder of the website Nordic-Math-Job advertising vacant academic positions in the Nordic university departments of Mathematics and Statistics.  This started off in 1997 as a one-man show, but is now supported by the mathematical societies in the Nordic countries and the National Committee for Mathematics of
The Royal Swedish Academy of Sciences.

Publications
 Introduction to Gaussian Geometry, Lund University (2021).
 Introduction to Riemannian Geometry, Lund University (2021).
 Research Papers

References

External links
 Home Page at Lund University
 Profile at Zentralblatt MATH 
 Profile at Google Scholar 
 Nordic-Math-Job - Established on the 14th of February 1997

Sigmundur Gudmundsson
20th-century Swedish mathematicians
21st-century Swedish  mathematicians
Alumni of the University of Leeds
Academic staff of Lund University
1960 births
Living people